The National Pan-Hellenic Council (NPHC) is a collaborative umbrella council composed of historically African American fraternities and sororities also referred to as Black Greek Letter Organizations (BGLOs). The NPHC was formed as a permanent organization on May 10, 1930, on the campus of Howard University, in Washington, D.C. with Matthew W. Bullock as the active Chairman and B. Beatrix Scott as Vice-Chairman. NPHC was incorporated under the laws of the State of Illinois in 1937.

The council promotes interaction through forums, meetings, and other media for the exchange of information and engages in cooperative programming and initiatives through various activities and functions.

Each constituent member organization determines its own strategic direction and program agenda. Today, the primary purpose and focus of member organizations remains camaraderie and academic excellence for its members and service to the communities they serve. Each promotes community awareness and action through educational, economic, and cultural service activities.

History
The National Pan-Hellenic Council was established in an era when Greek letter collegiate organizations founded by white Americans did not want to be affiliated with Greek letter collegiate organizations founded by African Americans.

The organization's stated purpose and mission in 1930:

Unanimity of thought and action as far as possible in the conduct of Greek letter collegiate fraternities and sororities, and to consider problems of mutual interest to its member organizations.

The founding members of the NPHC were  Alpha Kappa Alpha, Kappa Alpha Psi, Omega Psi Phi, Delta Sigma Theta, and Zeta Phi Beta. The council's membership expanded as Alpha Phi Alpha (1931), Phi Beta Sigma (1931), Sigma Gamma Rho (1937), and Iota Phi Theta (1996) later joined. In his book on BGLOs, The Divine Nine: The History of African-American Fraternities and Sororities in America (2001), Lawrence Ross coined the phrase "The Divine Nine" when referring to the coalition.
As required by various campus recognition policies, neither the NPHC, nor its member national or chapter organizations discriminate on the basis of race or religion.

In 1992, the first permanent national office for NPHC was established in Bloomington, Indiana on the campus of Indiana University through the joint cooperation of Indiana University and the National Board of Directors of NPHC.  Prior to its establishment, for over a 62-year period, the national office would sojourn from one officer to the next.

Affiliate organizations
The members of the National Pan-Hellenic Council are shown below in order of founding:

Traditional Greek housing

Traditional Greek housing amongst NPHC organizations is rare.  Unlike most National Panhellenic Conference (NPC) and North American Interfraternity Conference (NIC) organizations that have many traditional Greek houses primarily for undergraduate members on or near their college campuses, NPHC organizations have only a few.  Most of the few existing NPHC organization houses are untraditional and unaffiliated with a college.  In recent years, a growing number of undergraduate chapters of NPHC organizations have advocated for convenient traditional Greek housing for recruitment, meetings, stroll/step practices, socializing, and storing chapter paraphernalia but the lack of proper funding and coordination continues to be an issue.  In substitute of it, some undergraduate chapters have settled for small outdoor Greek plots to help substantiate their presence on campus.

See also
 Concilio Interfraternitario Puertorriqueño de la Florida
 Cultural interest fraternities and sororities
 Fraternity and Sorority Political Action Committee
 List of African-American fraternities
 List of social fraternities and sororities
 National Association of Latino Fraternal Organizations
 National Multicultural Greek Council
 Racism in Greek life

References

Further reading
 Brown, Tamara L., Gregory S. Parks, and Clarenda M. Phillips (2005). African American Fraternities and Sororities: The Legacy and the Vision. Lexington, KY: University Press of Kentucky. .
 Parks, Gregory Scott (2008). Black Greek-Letter Organizations in the 21st Century: Our Fight Has Just Begun. Lexington, KY: University Press of Kentucky. .
 Skocpol, Theda, Ariane Liazos, and Marshall Ganz (2006). What a Mighty Power We Can Be: African American Fraternal Groups and the Struggle for Racial Equality. Princeton, NJ: Princeton University Press. .

External links
 

 
1930 establishments in Washington, D.C.
Fraternities and sororities in the United States
Student organizations established in 1930
Student societies in the United States